Villar del Rey is a Spanish municipality in the province of Badajoz, Extremadura. It has a population of 2,540 (2007) and an area of 98.9 km².

References

External links 
  
 Profile 

Municipalities in the Province of Badajoz